Hodden or wadmel is a coarse kind of cloth made of undyed wool, formerly much worn by the peasantry of Scotland. It was usually made on small hand-looms by the peasants. Hodden grey was made by mixing black and white fleeces together in the proportion of one to twelve when weaving. The origin of the word is unknown.

In his poem "A Man's a Man for a' That", Robert Burns wrote

What though on hamely fare we dine,
Wear hodden grey, an' a that;
Gie fools their silks, and knaves their wine;
A Man's a Man for a' that."

Hodden Grey was adopted by the London Scottish Regiment, and the Toronto Scottish Regiment (Canada). It was chosen because, as Lord Elcho said, "A soldier is a man hunter. As a deer stalker chooses the least visible of colours, so ought a soldier to be clad."

See also
 Wadmal

References

External links

Woven fabrics
Tartan
Scottish clothing

Toronto Scottish Regiment (Queen Elizabeth The Queen Mother's Own)
Waulked textiles